Elitserien is the top-tier of bandy in Sweden since 2007. The second season was played October–March 2008–09.

League table

Each team meet every other team twice during the season, so 26 rounds are played all in all.

The top eight teams went on to the quarter-finals in the play-off for the Swedish championship. Teams eleven and twelve had to play a qualifying round against teams from Allsvenskan to stay in Elitserien, while teams 13 and 14 were relegated without the possibility to re-qualify for Elitserien until next year.

Knock-out stage
A best-of-three playoff were used in the quarter-finals and best-of-five in the semi-finals. The crucial final for the Swedish Championship was played at Studenternas IP in Uppsala on 21 March 2009.

Final

Season statistics

Top scorers

References 

Elitserien (bandy) seasons
Bandy
Bandy
Elitserien
Elitserien